The 2021 Harlow District Council election took place on 6 May 2021 to elect members of Harlow District Council in Essex.  This was on the same day as other local elections. Control of the council was gained by the Conservative Party with 20 seats.

There are 11 wards, each with three councillors. One councillor for each ward was elected with additional by-elections for councillors in Church Langley and Toddbrook wards. Thus there were 13 seats being elected.

After the election, the composition of the council was:
Conservative 20
Labour 12
with one seat vacant. Sitting Councillor Danny Purton had died on 30 April during the election campaign.

Results Summary

One seat was vacant.

Ward results

Bush Fair

Church Langley

Great Parndon

Harlow Common

Little Parndon and Hare Street

Mark Hall

Netteswell

Old Harlow

Staple Tye

Sumners and Kingsmoor

Toddbrook

By-elections

Mark Hall

References

Harlow
2021
2020s in Essex